The Doug Crosley Show was a Canadian music variety television series which aired on CBC Television in 1973.

Premise
Doug Crosley had appeared in stage productions and on television series such as Juliette. For his own 1973 series, Crosley adopted country music styles in contrast to the traditional show tunes he previously performed.

Regular series bands were the Dave Shaw Orchestra and country group Humphrey and the Dumptrucks. Singlers Liliane Stillwell and Sherisse Laurence were additional series performers.

Scheduling
This half-hour series was broadcast Saturdays at 7:00 p.m. (Eastern) from 16 June to 21 July 1973.

References

External links
 

CBC Television original programming
1973 Canadian television series debuts
1973 Canadian television series endings
1970s Canadian variety television series